Saint-Amans may refer to the following communes in France:

Saint-Amans, Ariège, a former commune in the Ariège  département 
Saint-Amans, Aude, in the Aude  département
Saint-Amans, Lozère, in the Lozère  département
Saint-Amans-de-Pellagal, in the Tarn-et-Garonne  département
Saint-Amans-des-Cots, in the Aveyron  département 
Saint-Amans-du-Pech, in the Tarn-et-Garonne  département 
Saint-Amans-Soult, in the Tarn département 
Saint-Amans-Valtoret, in the Tarn département

See also
St.-Amans, taxonomic author abbreviation of Jean Florimond Boudon de Saint-Amans (1748–1831), French naturalist
Saint-Amand (disambiguation)
Saint-Amant (disambiguation)
Saint Amand